Scaphinotus violaceus is a species of ground beetle in the family Carabidae. It is found in North America.

Subspecies
These two subspecies belong to the species Scaphinotus violaceus:
 Scaphinotus violacea carolinae Valentine
 Scaphinotus violacea violacea

References

Further reading

 

Carabinae
Articles created by Qbugbot
Beetles described in 1863